Kevin Evans may refer to:

 Kevin L. Evans (born 1962), entertainment executive
 Kevin Evans (cricketer) (born 1963), former English cricketer
 Kevin Evans (ice hockey) (born 1965), Canadian ice hockey player
 Kevin Evans (cyclist)
 Kevin Evans (archer)